The European Conservative is a conservative English-language publication focusing on philosophy, politics, culture, and the arts. It publishes articles, essays, interviews, and reviews about different kinds of conservative, traditionalist, reactionary, and right-wing thought in Europe and across the world.

The European Conservative is published both as a quarterly print journal and as a website. Not all the content from the print edition is available online. In late 2021, the website started publishing daily news stories and news analysis.

History

Background and origins
The European Conservative originally began in 2008 as an informal, four-page newsletter written and edited by a group of volunteers associated with the Center for European Renewal (CER), a conservative organization originally based in Den Haag, now in Amsterdam.

The CER was formally founded in 2007, after a first exploratory meeting in 2006 held at Kasteel De Vanenburg in Putten, Netherlands, which brought together conservative scholars and writers from across Europe and the U.S. The CER now organizes an annual Vanenburg Meeting, named after the location of that first 2006 meeting.

Most prominent among the founders of the CER are the German publisher and writer Caspar Freiherr von Schrenck-Notzing (1927-2009), the Polish historian and philosopher Miłowit Kuniński (1946-2018), and the British political philosopher Roger Scruton (1944-2020). Other key figures involved with the CER are ethicist and political philosopher Andreas Kinneging of the University of Leiden, political scientist András Lánczi, former rector of Corvinus University in Budapest, and R.R. Reno, editor of First Things.

Development and growth 
Five editions of The European Conservative were published intermittently over a two-year period by a group of volunteers associated with the CER and the Vanenburg Meeting, before production was paused at the end of 2010.

In 2012, former speechwriter, financial journalist, and editor (and co-founder of the CER) Alvino-Mario Fantini volunteered to take over as editor, working with a group of remote volunteers. The publication was re-designed, and new content and features were added (e.g., a cover image, book reviews, ads). The page count was also increased. Distribution of the publication continued in limited print runs but also as a free .pdf distributed by email and available online.

The European Conservative has published material over the years both by people closely associated with the CER, as well as by other well-known authors, such as Anthony Daniels (Theodore Dalrymple), Remi Brague, Ryszard Legutko, Chantal Delsol, Mark Dooley, Todd Huizinga, Charles Coulombe, Alberto Fernandez, Roger Watson, among others. In recent years, it has also published less-well-known authors and emerging scholars from around the world, particularly those working in languages other than English.

Since 2019, The European Conservative has been an independent publication published by the European Conservative Nonprofit Ltd., in collaboration with the research organization CEDI/EDIC in Vienna, the Italian think-tank Nazione Futura in Rome, and the Bibliothek des Konservatismus in Berlin.

The publication's current Editor-in-Chief is Alvino-Mario Fantini, who has also previously written for The American Spectator, Crisis, The New Criterion, Far Eastern Economic Review, Catholic World Report, The American Conservative, and The Wall Street Journal Europe. He is also a frequent public speaker, and has appeared at various events organized by ADF International, Austrian Economics Center, New Direction, De Nicola Center for Ethics and Culture at the University of Notre Dame, CEFAS at CEU-San Pablo University, the ID Group at the European Parliament, and the National Conservatism conferences.

Activities and events 
The European Conservative has organized and co-sponsored several events over the years. In June 2021, to mark the re-design and re-launch of the publication (with its Summer 2021 edition) it held a panel discussion with several scholars at one of the Scruton Cafes in Budapest, Hungary.

In September 2021, to mark the publication of its Fall 2021 edition, the publication organized a day-long series of panels at the Lónyay-Hatvany Villa in Budapest, with invited guests from the academic and political world.

In March 2022, the publication was one of several official partners of the National Conservatism Conference held in Brussels.

On September 30–October 2, 2022, five days after the snap elections in Italy, The European Conservative co-organized, with Nazione Futura and the Fondazione Tatarella, a two-day conference on “Italian Conservatism.” This included both English-language and Italian-language panels, with panelists and keynote speakers discussing and debating different conservative ideas as well as various approaches to conservative governance and policies. The event was heavily covered by various Italian and European media.

The European Conservative has also participated in the 2022 Young Leaders Academy, organized by New Direction and the Center for the Renewal of Culture in Split, with the Institut Iliade in Paris, and the Bibliothek des Konservatismus in Berlin.

Contributors
The European Conservative publishes both established and well-known conservative scholars and writers, as well as lesser known, young, or undiscovered writers around the world.

A few of the many contributors to The European Conservative over the years have included:

 Rémi Brague, French philosopher and winner of the 2012 Ratzinger Award.
 Charles Coulombe, historian and specialist in the Austro-Hungarian monarchy.
 Chantal Delsol, French philosopher.
 Anthony Daniels, English essayist.
 Mark Dooley, Irish philosopher, writer and newspaper columnist.
 Alberto M. Fernandez, former U.S. diplomat and Vice President of the Middle East Media Research Institute (MEMRI).
 Anne-Élisabeth Moutet, French journalist, writer and columnist.
 John O’Sullivan, president of the Danube Institute in Budapest and senior fellow at the National Review Institute in Washington, D.C.

Controversy 

In the Summer of 2022, the publication’s UK stockist, WHSmith, removed all copies of The European Conservative from its shelves after complaints by two prominent customers—Alexi Kaye Campbell, a Greek-British playwright, and his civil partner Dominic Cooke, an English director and writer—over some of the publication’s content. 

Pointing to an interview with Hungarian Prime Minister Viktor Orbán in the Spring 2022 edition which was critical commentary about pride marches, and an editorial cartoon by libertarian artist “Bob,” Campbell and Cooke urged friends and followers on Instagram and Twitter to pressure WHSmith into removing the magazine—which they called “fascist filth”—from their shelves.

Outlets such as Tichys Einblick (Germany), National Catholic Register (U.S.), Gaceta de la Iberoesfera (Spain), Power Line (U.S.), and Junge Freiheit (Germany), among others, covered the incident. After a mild media storm, WHSmith decided to allow for the return of the publication starting with the Fall 2022 edition.

References

Magazines established in 2008
Conservative magazines